This article details the fixtures and results of the Thailand national football team in 2012.
 Only record the results that affect the FIFA/Coca-Cola World Ranking. See FIFA 'A' matches criteria.

Record

Goalscorers

vs Norway
International friendly  (2012 King's Cup)

vs Maldives
International friendly

vs Oman
2014 FIFA World Cup qualification – AFC Third Round  

Assistant referees:
 Toru Sagara (Japan)
 Haruhiro Otsuka (Japan)
Fourth official:
 Jumpei Iida (Japan)

vs Malaysia
International friendly

vs Bhutan
International friendly

vs Bangladesh
International friendly

vs Philippines
2012 AFF Championship — Group Round 

Assistant referees:
Haruhiro Otsuka (Japan)
Su Jige (China)
Fourth official:
Ma Ning  (China)

vs Myanmar
2012 AFF Championship — Group Round 

Assistant referees:
 Abdullah Mubarak Mohamed Al-Shammakhi (Oman)
 Haruhiro Otsuka (Japan)
Fourth official:
Ryuji Sato  (Japan)

vs Vietnam
2012 AFF Championship — Group Round 

Assistant referees:
 Haruhiro Otsuka (Japan)
 Hadi Kassar (Lebanon)
Fourth official:
 André El Haddad  (Lebanon)

vs Malaysia(1)
2012 AFF Championship — Semifinal First Leg

Assistant referees:
 Mohammadreza Abolfazli (Iran)
 Mohammad Reza Mansouri (Iran)
Fourth official:
 Ng Kai Lam (Hong Kong)

vs Malaysia(2)
2012 AFF Championship — Semifinal Second Leg

Assistant referees:
 Lee Jung-Min (South Korea)
 Ji Seung Min (South Korea)
Fourth official:
 Kim Dae-Young (South Korea)

vs Singapore(1)
2012 AFF Championship — Final First Leg

Assistant referees:
 Toshiyuki Nagi (Japan)
 Kazushimo Miyajima(Japan)
Fourth official:
 Ryuji Sato (Japan)

vs Singapore(2)
2012 AFF Championship — Final Second Leg

Assistant referees:
 Jakhongir Saidov (Uzbekistan)
 Abduxamidullo Rasulov (Uzbekistan)
Fourth official:
 Vladislav Tseytlin (Uzbekistan)

External links
Fixtures and Results on FIFA.com
Thailand Matches on Elo Ratings

2012 in Thai football
2012 national football team results
Thailand national football team results